Eric Sladden was an Australian professional rugby league footballer who played in the 1950s and 1960s.  He played for South Sydney and North Sydney in the NSWRL premiership as a winger.

Playing career
Sladden made his first grade debut for South Sydney in 1956.  In 1957, Sladden scored five tries in a match against Parramatta at Cumberland Oval.  Sladden holds this record with other Souths legends including Harold Horder and John Graves.  After a successful spell at Souths, Sladden joined North Sydney and spent six seasons with the club including being a member of two finals campaigns, the first being in 1964 when Norths reached the finals for the first time in a number of years before losing to Balmain and in 1965 when the club finished second on the table only to bow out in consecutive finals matches.  Sladden retired at the end of 1967.

References

South Sydney Rabbitohs players
North Sydney Bears players
Rugby league players from Sydney
Rugby league wingers
1936 births
2016 deaths